Jim Hawkins (born 1962) is a BBC radio presenter.

Biography

Personal life
Hawkins was born in Essex and brought up there and in Warwickshire, England. He now lives in Shropshire.

Career
Hawkins' broadcasting career began on a student radio station at Warwick University. He worked for independent local radio station Mercia Sound from 1981 to 1983. He joined BBC Radio 4 in 1984, writing and presenting the News Stand programme. Hawkins has worked for several commercial and BBC local radio stations across the United Kingdom in various roles on both sides of the microphone, including spells as a producer and manager.

Hawkins has also worked for a disability-rights group and as a newspaper journalist, hotel restaurant pianist, and stagehand; at one point he ran the coconut shy on Brighton Pier. During his career he has interviewed notable figures including Gordon Brown, Gene Simmons and Steve Cropper.

Hawkins hosts a programme every weekday from 9 am to 12 noon on BBC Radio Shropshire called "Jim Hawkins in the Morning". Hawkins uses Twitter to interact with listeners during the show, having been persuaded to try Twitter after finding his Facebook experience disappointing. Hawkins also hosts a Saturday night programme entitled "Saturday Night with Jim Hawkins" broadcast by BBC Shropshire, BBC Hereford & Worcester, and BBC Radio Stoke. The show was first broadcast on 4 April 2009 and concluded on 5 January 2013. Since the December 2011 issue, on whose front cover he was pictured, he has written a monthly column for Shropshire Life magazine.

Awards
In 2002, Hawkins received a silver Sony Radio Academy Award in the "interactive" category, for his drive-time programme The Baldy Brothers on
Century FM. He was also highly commended at the BT sponsored Regional News and Current Affairs Awards. Hawkins was one of five shortlisted for the 2006 Sony Radio Academy Speech Broadcaster of the Year Award.

References

External links
 BBC Hereford & Worcester feature
 'Jim Hawkins's diary' (BBC Shropshire)
 

Living people
British radio presenters
People from Warwickshire
People from Essex
BBC people
1962 births
BBC Radio 4 presenters